Theraps is a genus of cichlid fish found in moderately to fast-flowing rivers and streams on the Atlantic slope of southern Mexico and northern Central America. They are medium-sized cichlids.

Species and taxonomy
Historically, Theraps was included in Cichlasoma. Once recognized as its own genus, it sometimes included a wide range of species now known to belong in other genera, including Cincelichthys, Chortiheros, Chuco, Cryptoheros, Kihnichthys, Oscura, Paraneetroplus, Rheoheros, Talamancaheros, Tomocichla and Wajpamheros. In a major review of 2015, only five species remained in this genus, but in 2016 it was shown that four of these were not close relatives of the Theraps type species, T. irregularis, resulting in them being moved to Chuco and Wajpamheros. As a consequence, Catalog of Fishes now recognizes Theraps as only including the type species T. irregularis, but FishBase include both it and the three Chuco species in Theraps, resulting in a genus that is not monophyletic. The four species placed in this genus by FishBase are:

 Theraps godmanni (Günther, 1862) (Southern checkmark cichlid)
 Theraps intermedius (Günther, 1862) (Northern checkmark cichlid)
 Theraps irregularis Günther, 1862 (Arroyo cichlid)
 Theraps microphthalmus (Günther, 1862)

References

Heroini
Cichlid genera
Taxa named by Albert Günther